Gustavo Pallicca (Turin, 4 January 1936) is an Italian writer and former athletics starter.

Biography
In his career as a writer has published twelve books, mostly about sport.

Books
Ai vostri posti, pronti, via (On your marks, get set, go), FIDAL 1996
Arturo Maffei: un salto...lungo una vita (Arturo Maffei, a jump...long a lifetime), Capezzano Pianore, Grafics 1999
A world history of sprint racing: the stellar events: 100 m, 200 m and 4x100 m relay: men and women (1850–2005), with Roberto L. Quercetani, Cassina de Pecchi 2006 – 
I figli del vento. Storia dei 100 metri ai giochi olimpici. Vol. 1: Le origini da Atene 1896 a Londra 1908. (The sons of the wind: the history of the 100 meters at the Olympic Games – Vol.1 The origins: from Athens 1896 to London 1908), Simple 2006 – 
I figli del vento: la storia dei 100 metri ai Giochi Olimpici – Vol.2: L'affermazione : da Stoccolma 1912 a Los Angeles 1932 (The sons of the wind: the history of the 100 meters at the Olympic Games – Vol.2 The statement: from Stockholm 1912 to Los Angeles 1932), Edizioni Riva 2009

References

External links 
  Writer profile at the Atleticanet.it

1935 births
Living people
Writers from Turin
Italian male writers